Anita Marie Josey-Herring (born September 19, 1960) is the chief judge on the Superior Court of the District of Columbia.

Education and career 
Josey-Herring received her Bachelor of Arts from Virginia Commonwealth University in 1982 and her Juris Doctor from Georgetown University Law Center in 1987.

After graduating, she served as a law clerk for Judge Herbert B. Dixon Jr. on the D.C. Superior Court.

D.C. Superior Court 
On September 2, 1997, President Bill Clinton nominated Josey-Herring to a fifteen-year term as an associate judge on the Superior Court of the District of Columbia to the seat vacated by Colleen Kollar-Kotelly. On October 30, 1997, the Senate Committee on Governmental Affairs held a hearing on her nomination. On November 5, 1997, the Committee reported her nomination favorably to the senate floor. On November 7, 1997, the full Senate confirmed her nomination by voice vote.

On September 11, 2012, the Commission on Judicial Disabilities and Tenure recommended that President Obama reappoint her to second fifteen-year term as a judge on the D.C. Superior Court.

On July 21, 2020, the Nominating Commission selected Josey-Herring to be the next Chief Judge of the Superior Court. She was sworn in on October 16, 2020.

References

1960 births
Living people
20th-century American women judges
20th-century American judges
21st-century American judges
21st-century American women judges
Georgetown University Law Center alumni
Judges of the Superior Court of the District of Columbia
People from Portsmouth, Virginia
Virginia Commonwealth University alumni